Marisa Anderson is an American multi-instrumentalist and composer based in Portland, Oregon. She is primarily known for playing the guitar, mixing American primitive guitar with various genres from throughout the United States and the rest of the world, and for her largely improvised compositions. She has released 10 albums under her own name since 2006, as well as several others with the bands the Dolly Ranchers and Evolutionary Jass Band.

Early life 
Anderson was born in Northern California and grew up in Sonoma. Her earliest musical memories are of listening to church music and classical in her mother's car, and country in her dad's truck including Doc Watson and the Oak Ridge Boys. She started playing guitar at age ten. In her teen and young adult years, she took lessons from fellow California guitarist Nina Gerber. A self-described "weird teenager", she learned about various styles of folk music from different parts of the world – including British, African, Appalachian music, and Mississippi Delta blues – by reading books from folklorist Cecil Sharp. She attended Humboldt State University before dropping out at age 19.

Career 
After dropping out of college, Anderson spent about ten years living in her car or in a tent and walking around the US to raise awareness for environmental issues. Some of this time was spent in Mexico where she was a part of Circo de Manos and performed among the indigenous peoples and subsistence farmers during the Chiapas conflict in Southern Mexico. She was a member of the country-folk band the Dolly Ranchers from 1997 through 2003, playing on both of their albums and at their four-sets-a-night gig at a cowboy bar in New Mexico. She also worked at Rock Camp for Girls between 2003 and 2011, and contributed to its eponymous book. She settled in Portland, Oregon after traveling to the Pacific Northwest for the 1999 Seattle WTO protests. In Portland, she joined the improvisational ensemble Evolutionary Jass Band for six years, recording three albums.

Her first solo album, Holiday Motel, was released by 16 Records in 2006, and earned her a nomination for the OUTmusic Award for Best Female Debut Record. That album was followed by 2009's The Golden Hour and 2013's Mercury, both released by Mississippi Records; and another 2013 album, Traditional and Public Domain Songs, which was released by Grapefruit Records. In 2014, she appeared as a guest musician on Sharon Van Etten's Are We There, playing guitar on its first track "Afraid of Nothing". In 2015, she released an eponymous split album with Bhutan-born guitarist Tashi Dorji which was released by Footfalls Records. The year after, she released Into the Light on her own label Chaos Kitchen Music. After this, she signed to Thrill Jockey with whom she has released her four most recent albums, 2018's Cloud Corner; 2020's The Quickening, a collaboration with Australian drummer Jim White; 2021's Lost Futures, a collaboration with American folk guitarist William Tyler; and 2022's Still, Here.

Anderson had a cameo appearance alongside fellow Oregon-based musician Michael Hurley in the 2018 film Leave No Trace where they perform the songs "O My Stars" and "Dark Holler" around a campfire.

Anderson has toured and played live with numerous artists, including her album collaborators Tashi Dorji, William Tyler, and Jim White, as well as Yasmin Williams, Giorgos Xylouris, Ed Kuepper, Circuit des Yeux, Emmylou Harris, Godspeed You! Black Emperor, Charlie Parr, and Bill Callahan. She has performed at music festivals including Big Ears Festival, Pitchforks Midwinter at the Art Institute of Chicago, Le Guess Who?, and Moogfest. She also performed on NPR Music's Tiny Desk Concerts series in 2014, mostly playing songs from Traditional and Public Domain Songs and Mercury.

Style 
Anderson's music has been described as falling into the American primitive guitar style introduced by John Fahey in the 1960s, as well as being called a "neo-Americana guitar outsider". She mixes in influences from various other genres such as gospel, country, Appalachian folk and blues, jazz, circus music, minimalism, electronic, drone, and 20th century classical, while also including global influences such as Tuareg and Latin music on Cloud Corner and flamenco on Still, Here. Her music is also referred to as experimental on some albums. Anderson's main instrument is guitar, both acoustic and electric, but she has also employed other instruments across her albums such as lap steel guitar, pedal steel guitar, and Wurlitzer electronic piano on Into the Light; and charango and requinto guitar on Cloud Corner. Her instrument collection also includes a Dobro from the 1930s, a terz guitar, a nylon-string parlor guitar, a custom Warmoth Telecaster with Lollar P-90 guitar pickups, and a Gibson ES-125 from the early 1940s.

She is known to improvise music rather than compose it on many of her recordings, including the entirety of her album The Quickening. On the subject, she has said she likes "to think about improvisation as a conversation" and that it's "really just an art at being literate and expressive no matter what language you are in... I am trying to be very present with the music and to make my intention realized with every performance." When asked in an interview how she got into improvisation, she said she grew up playing classical music where "there's a boss. What's on the page is the boss. What the composer intended, that's the boss. In classical music, you're not your own boss ever." She said that's fine and that she's not opposed to structure, but that "in the creative process, I like to be free. Once it's the performance, there's room for all of it in my music. Some things I do exactly the same, and that's its own fun thing, is to adhere to that. Some things I do differently. In performance, what changes is the dynamic in the room."

Discography

Solo 
Albums
 Holiday Motel (2006, 16 Records)
 The Golden Hour (2009, Mississippi)
 Mercury (2013, Mississippi)
 Traditional and Public Domain Songs (2013, Grapefruit)
 Tashi Dorji / Marisa Anderson (2015, Footfalls) (with Tashi Dorji)
 Into the Light (2016, Chaos Kitchen)
 Cloud Corner (2018, Thrill Jockey)
 The Quickening (2020, Thrill Jockey) (with Jim White)
 Lost Futures (2021, Thrill Jockey) (with William Tyler)
 Still, Here (2022, Thrill Jockey)

Singles
 "Into the Light" (2016, Into the Light)
 "He Is Without His Guns" (2016, Into the Light)
 "You'd Be So Nice to Come Home To" (2020, with Tara Jane O'Neil)
 "The Lucky" (2020, The Quickening)
 "Gathering" and "Pallet" (2020, The Quickening)
 "Lost Futures" (2021, Lost Futures)
 "Hurricane Light" (2021, Lost Futures)
 "At the Edge of the World" (2021, Lost Futures)
 "Waking" (2022, Still, Here)
 "La Llorona" (2022, Still, Here)
 "The Fire This Time" (2022, Still, Here)

With the Dolly Ranchers 
 Ten O'Clock Bird (2000, Chaos Kitchen)
 Escape Artist (2002, Chaos Kitchen)

With the Evolutionary Jass Band 
 Change of Scene (2006, Community Library)
 What's Lost (2007, Mississippi)
 Pure Light (2009, Jaffe)

References 

Living people
21st-century American women guitarists
Guitarists from California
Musicians from Portland, Oregon
Guitarists from Oregon
American folk guitarists
Americana musicians
American women environmentalists
Thrill Jockey artists
Year of birth missing (living people)
California State Polytechnic University, Humboldt alumni
People from Sonoma, California